The national flag of Madagascar was adopted on 14 October 1958, two years before the independence as they prepared for a referendum on its status in the French Community.

The colors of the flag represent Madagascar's history and traditional peasant classes. Red and white were the colors of the Merina kingdom, which was conquered by France in 1896. They were used in the flag of the last Merina monarch, Queen Ranavalona III. Green was the color of the Hova, the largest class of peasant commoners, who played a significant role in anti-French agitation and the independence movement.

Current flags

Ethnic

Military

Historical flags

Presidential Standards

Malagasy Republic

Democratic Republic of Madagascar

Third Republic of Madagascar

See also 
 Seal of Madagascar

References

External links

 Madagascar flag at Flagscorner

Madagascar
National symbols of Madagascar
Madagascar
Madagascar